Shineh-ye Sofla (also Romanized as Shīneh-ye Soflá) is a village in Qalayi Rural District, Firuzabad District, Selseleh County, Lorestan Province, Iran. At the 2006 census, its population was 138, in 25 families.

References 

Towns and villages in Selseleh County